Cynthian Township is one of the fourteen townships of Shelby County, Ohio, United States.  The 2000 census found 1,972 people in the township.

Geography
Located in the western part of the county, it borders the following townships:
McLean Township – north
Turtle Creek Township – east
Washington Township – southeast
Loramie Township – south
Wayne Township, Darke County – southwest
Patterson Township, Darke County – west

No municipalities are located in Cynthian Township, although the census-designated place of Newport is located in the center of the township.

Name and history
Cynthian Township was organized in 1825. It is the only Cynthian Township statewide.

Government
The township is governed by a three-member board of trustees, who are elected in November of odd-numbered years to a four-year term beginning on the following January 1. Two are elected in the year after the presidential election and one is elected in the year before it. There is also an elected township fiscal officer, who serves a four-year term beginning on April 1 of the year after the election, which is held in November of the year before the presidential election. Vacancies in the fiscal officership or on the board of trustees are filled by the remaining trustees.

References

External links
County website

Townships in Shelby County, Ohio
Populated places established in 1825
1825 establishments in Ohio
Townships in Ohio